The 1936 Florida Gators football team represented the University of Florida during the 1936 college football season. The season was Josh Cody's first as the new head coach of the Florida Gators football team. But the season was also remembered for the Gators' three 7–0 shutout losses to South Carolina, Kentucky, and Mississippi State. Cody's 1936 Florida Gators finished 4–6 overall and 1–5 in the Southeastern Conference (SEC), placing tenth of thirteen SEC teams in the conference standings—Cody's worst SEC finish in four seasons as the Gators football coach.

Schedule

Primary source: 2015 Florida Gators Football Media Guide.

Postseason
Mayberry earned second-team All-Southeastern Conference honors at the conclusion of the season.

References

Florida
Florida Gators football seasons
Florida Gators football